Leesville is an unincorporated community located in Wake County, North Carolina, United States.

References

Unincorporated communities in Wake County, North Carolina
Research Triangle
Unincorporated communities in North Carolina